Dongfeng is a town in the north of Zhongshan, Guangdong, China.

External links
Dongfeng government website (in Simplified Chinese)

Zhongshan
Towns in Guangdong